Philolithus is a genus of darkling beetles in the family Tenebrionidae. There are about seven described species in the genus Philolithus.

Species
These seven species belong to the genus Philolithus:
 Philolithus actuosus (Horn, 1870) b
 Philolithus aeger b
 Philolithus densicollis (Horn, 1894) g b
 Philolithus elatus b
 Philolithus morbillosus (LeConte, 1858) b
 Philolithus opimus b
 Philolithus sordidus b
Data sources: i = ITIS, c = Catalogue of Life, g = GBIF, b = Bugguide.net

References

Further reading

External links

 
 

Pimeliinae